John (Jake) Macmillan  (13 September 1924—12 May 2014) was a British scientist who worked at the interface between biology and chemistry. He became a leading authority on the plant growth hormones, gibberellins.

Early life and education

MacMillan was born on 13 September 1924 in Wishaw, Lanarkshire. Despite several offers to play professional football, ge started his undergraduate degree at the University of Glasgow where he focused on chemistry but took botany as a subsidiary subject. In 1946, he graduated with a first class honours degree. He continues playing as a semi-professional footballer for Third Lanark. MacMillan continued education and started his PhD at the University of Glasgow under the supervision of J. D. Loudon.

Research and career

Following the completion of his PhD, Jake was deterred by the low academic salaries and instead joined the ICI Akers Laboratory near Welwyn.

Jake joined the School of Chemistry at the University of Bristol in 1963, working there until 1990 when he moved to Long Ashton Research Station. He returned to the University of Bristol in 2003 as emeritus professor and senior research fellow.

He was elected Fellow of the Royal Society in 1978 and Foreign Associate of the US National Academy of Sciences in 1991.

References 

1924 births
2014 deaths
20th-century British biologists
21st-century British biologists
21st-century British chemists
20th-century British chemists